There were a variety of flags flown by ships of the Commonwealth during the Interregnum of 1649–1660.

At sea, royalist ships continued to fly the Union Jack of 1606, while on 22 February 1649 the Council of State decided to send the parliamentary navy an order (signed by Oliver Cromwell on 23 February) that "the ships at sea in service of the State shall onely beare the red Crosse in a white flag" (viz., the flag of England).
On 5 March 1649 the Council further ordered "that the Flagg that is to be borne by the Admiral, Vice-Admiral, and Rere-Admiral be that now presented, viz., the Armes of England and Ireland in two severall Escotcheons in a Red Flagg, within a compartment."
A sole surviving example of a naval flag following this description is kept by the National Maritime Museum at Greenwich, others having fallen victim to the destruction of Commonwealth symbols at the Restoration of Charles II.
Scotland was formally united with England in 1654. According to Perrin (1922), the saltire of Scotland did not reappear on naval flags of the Commonwealth until 1658.

In 1658 Cromwell's personal standard as Lord Protector became the 'Standard for the General of his Highnesse fleet', while the Cross-and-Harp jack was replaced by the "Protectorate Jack", consisting of the royal Union Flag with the addition of the Irish Harp at the centre.

Flags of the Commonwealth

See also 
List of English flags
Coat of arms of England

Notes

References 

Dave Martucci, Christopher Southworth, Vincent Morley, Jarig Bakker, United Kingdom: Flags of the Interregnum, 1649–1660. Flags of the World (1999, 2010). Retrieved 30 March 2011.

External links 
http://flagspot.net/flags/gb-inter.html

Interregnum
Interregnum
Lists of flags of the United Kingdom
Stuart England